Patna Sahib railway station, station code PNC (formerly Patna City Station), which came into existence even before Patna Jn. in 1861 is an important railway station in the Danapur railway division of East Central Railway. Patna Saheb is connected to metropolitan areas of India, by the Delhi–Kolkata main line via Mugalsarai–Patna route. Patna Saheb is located in Patna City in Patna district in the Indian state of Bihar. Due to its location on the Howrah–Patna–Varanasi main line many Patna, Barauni-bound express trains coming from Howrah, Sealdah stop here.
Based on Income it is 'A' Grade railway station and has good Passenger Amenities.This is important railway station for Sikh devotees as tenth Sikh Guru Govind Singh was born at Patna Saheb.
There will be 2 escalators in near future at Patna Saheb Station as Foundation Stone is laid done.
After Platform Number-2 and 3 a New Rail line and New Platform is being proposed.

History
Patna Saheb (or Sahib) station's former name is Begumpur station, in memory of Begum Saheba.

Patna Saheb station's present name was declared on 8 Jan 1976 by the railway minister Boota Singh.

Facilities 
The major facilities available are Upper Class Waiting room & hall, computerized reservation facility, reserved lounge, retiring room, clock room and platforms well covered by sheds.
There is a pay and use toilet, tea stall, book stall, upgraded announcement system, free RailWire WiFi, bottle crusher and water vending machine. Installation of CCTV camera is made at station for passenger safety.

Coach Indicator at platforms helps passengers to find there train coaches. Mobile charging point at this station is also available. Fly trapper at platform reduce from insect attack.

Big Bazaar (Mall) is opened in the vacant land of Patna Saheb station.

Tourist Information Centre is open for giving information of tourism of Bihar.

Platforms
There are three platforms (platform no. 4 proposed) which are interconnected with two foot overbridges (FOB).

Trains 
Many passenger and express trains serve Patna Saheb Station.

Nearest airports
The nearest airports to Patna Saheb station are:
Lok Nayak Jayaprakash Airport, Patna 
Birsa Munda Airport, Ranchi  
Gaya Airport 
Netaji Subhash Chandra Bose International Airport, Kolkata

References

External links 
 Patna Saheb station map
 Official website of the Patna district

Danapur railway division
Railway stations in Patna